Matthias Bachinger and Dominik Meffert took the title, beating Gong Maoxin and Peng Hsien-yin 6–3, 3–6, [10–6]

Seeds

Draw

Draw

References
 Main Draw

Maserati Challenger - Doubles
2014 Doubles